Vernon Dobtcheff (born 14 August 1934) is a British actor, best known for his roles on television and film, he has acted in numerous stage productions.

Biography
Dobtcheff was born in Nîmes, France, of Russian descent. He attended Ascham Preparatory School in Eastbourne, Sussex, England, in the 1940s, where he won the Acting Cup. One of his many television roles was as the Chief Scientist in the Doctor Who series The War Games in 1969, in which he became the first actor ever to mention the Time Lords by name. He appeared in the Blake's 7 episode "Shadow" as the Chairman of the Terra Nostra in 1979. He has appeared in such films as The Day of the Jackal (1973), Murder on the Orient Express (1974), The Spy Who Loved Me (1977), Indiana Jones and the Last Crusade (1989), and Before Sunset (2004).

In his 2006 memoir, Red Carpets and Other Banana Skins, British actor Rupert Everett describes an encounter with Dobtcheff on the boat train to Paris, and reveals his extraordinary reputation as the "patron saint" of the acting profession, stating that Dobtcheff "was legendary not so much for his acting as for his magical ability to catch every first night in the country". 

Dobtcheff appeared in the Doctor Who audio drama The Children of Seth in which he plays the role of Shamur.

Selected film & TV roles

Those Magnificent Men in Their Flying Machines (1965) as French Team Member (uncredited)
Darling (1965) as Art Critic (uncredited)
Return from the Ashes (1965) as Man breaking up nightclub fight (uncredited)
The Idol (1966) as Man at Party
The Taming of the Shrew (1967) as Pedant
A Dandy in Aspic (1968) as Stein
The Tyrant King (1968) as M.Le Coq
Baby Love (1969) as Man in Cinema
The Assassination Bureau (1969) as Baron Muntzof
Anne of the Thousand Days (1969) as Mendoza
Darling Lili (1970) as Otto Kraus
The Beast in the Cellar (1970) as Sir Bernard Newsmith
Les mariés de l'an II (1971) as Le pasteur
The Horsemen (1971) as Zam Hajji
Fiddler on the Roof (1971) as Russian Official
Nicholas and Alexandra (1971) as Dr. Lazovert
Mary, Queen of Scots (1971) as Duc François de Guise
The Canterbury Tales (1972) as The Manager
Up the Front (1972) as Muller
The Day of the Jackal (1973) as The Interrogator
Story of a Love Story (1973)
Revolt of the City (1973)
Soft Beds, Hard Battles (1974) as Padre
Fall of Eagles (1974) as Count Stookau
The Marseille Contract (1974) as Lazar
Murder on the Orient Express (1974) as Concierge
Scent of a Woman (1974) as Don Carlo (uncredited)
Galileo (1975) as First Secretary
Playing with Fire (1975) as Un messager
India Song (1975) as George Crown
Le Chat et la souris (1975) as le complice de Germain
Il Messia (1975) as Samuele
Operation Daybreak (1975) as Pyotr
Le Sauvage (1975) as Coleman
Michel Strogoff (1975) (TV miniseries) as Harry Blount
Dickens of London (1976) as Legal gentleman
Joseph Andrews (1977) as Fop Two
The Spy Who Loved Me (1977) as Max Kalba
March or Die (1977) as Mean corporal
1990 (1977) as Professor Cheever
La petite fille en velours bleu (1978) as Lamberti
CIA contro KGB (1978) as Le réceptionniste
Nijinsky (1980) as Sergei Grigoriev
Sredni Vashtar (1981) as the Doctor
Masada (1981) as Roman Chief Priest
Condorman (1981) as Russian Agent
La nuit de Varennes (1982) as Le juge saisie
Enigma (1982)
Nutcracker (1982) as Markovitch
Marco Polo (1982) as Pietro D'Abano
Wagner (1983) as Giacomo Meyerbeer
 (1984) as James – le majordome
The Perils of Gwendoline in the Land of the Yik-Yak (1984)
A.D. (1985) as Titus Flavius Sabinus
Morenga (1985) as Lohmann
Mata Hari (1985) as Prosecutor
The Six Napoleons from The Return of Sherlock Holmes (1986) as Herr Mendelstam
Caravaggio (1986) as Art Lover
The Name of the Rose (1986) as Hugh of Newcastle
Maschenka (1987) as Yasha
Natalia (1988) as Alfred Grabner
Catacombs (1988) as Brother Timothy
Pascali's Island (1988) as Pariente
Madame Sousatzka (1988) as Music Critic
Testimony (1988) as Gargolovsky
Splendor (1989) as Don Arno
Indiana Jones and the Last Crusade (1989) as Butler
The Hostage of Europe (1989) as Hudson Lowe
The Plot to Kill Hitler (1990) as Erich Fellgiebel
The Krays (1990) as Teacher
The Garden (1990)
A Season of Giants (1990) as Jacopo Galli
Vincent and Me (1990) as Dr. Winkler
Hamlet (1990) as Reynaldo
Let Him Have It (1991) as Clerk of Court
Prisoner of Honor (1991) as Rennes Prosecutor
Les Enfants du naufrageur (1992)
Toutes peines confondues (1992) as Thurston
Venice/Venice (1992) as Alexander
M. Butterfly (1993) as Agent Etancelin
The Hour of the Pig (1993) as Apothecary
Agatha Christie's Poirot ("Hercule Poirot's Christmas"; 1994) as Simeon Lee
Jefferson in Paris (1995) as King's Translator
England, My England (1995) as Spratt
Surviving Picasso (1996) as Diaghilev
Jude (1996) as Curator
The Ogre (1996) as Lawyer
Anna Karenina (1997) as Pestov
The Odyssey (1997 miniseries) as Aegyptus
As Time Goes By (1997) as Dr Stoker
Déjà vu (1997) as Konstantine
Father Ted ("Are You Right There Father Ted?"; 1998) as Old Nazi
Merlin (1998) as 1st Physician
Jinnah (1998) as Lord Willingdon
Hilary and Jackie (1998) as Professor Bentley
Spanish Fly (1998) as Carl's Friend
St. Ives (1998) as Bonnefoy
Dreaming of Joseph Lees (1999) as Italian Doctor
The Body (2001) as Monsignor
Revelation (2001) as Curé at Rennes-le-Chateau
Festival in Cannes (2001) as Millie's Escort
The Order (2001) as Oscar Cafmeyer, Rudy's father
The Red Siren (2002) as Vitali
Merci Docteur Rey (2002) as François
White Teeth (2002) as 'The Devil of Dachau'
Brocéliande (2003) as Professeur Brennos
Before Sunset (2004) as Bookstore Manager
Evilenko (2004) as Bagdasarov
Iznogoud (2005) as Kitussé
Empire of the Wolves (2005) as Kudseyi
An American Haunting (2005) as Elder #1
Priceless (2006) as Jacques
Rome TV series - Season 2 (2007) as The Rabbi
Asterix at the Olympic Games (2008) as Un druide (uncredited)
Undisputed III: Redemption (2010) as Rezo
Zarafa (2012) as Le vieux sage (voice)
The Great Beauty (2013) as Arturo
The Invisible Boy (2014) as Artiglio
The Man with the Iron Heart (2017) as Emile Hacha
The 15:17 to Paris (2018) as Older Man
L'hypothèse de la reine rouge (2018) as Sherlock Holmes
The Haunting of Margam Castle (2020) as Enos

References

External links

 Le coin du cinéphage

1934 births
English male film actors
English male television actors
English people of Russian descent
French emigrants to England
Living people
People from Nîmes
French people of Russian descent
20th-century English male actors
21st-century English male actors